Hospital Angeles Tijuana is a skyscraper and prominent fixture in Tijuana, Mexico. It serves as the primary hospital of Tijuana. The building includes office space as well as the main hospital which is located within a complex composed of another building, a 5-story tower, which on its roof has a heliport, being the first hospital in the city with such a feature.

It is located within the central business district of Tijuana, the Zona Rio.

Gallery

See also
List of tallest buildings in Tijuana

External links
Hospital Ángeles Tijuana
 Video of Hospital Angeles, Tijuana

Skyscrapers in Tijuana